Abdou Karim Coulibaly (born 3 June 1993) is a Senegalese-born French professional footballer who plays for SAS Épinal as a left winger.

Career
Born in Bakel, Senegal, Coulibaly signed for the AS Nancy training centre aged 14, whilst training at US Villejuif. He signed his first professional contract, of three years duration, in 2013. His first team debut came as a substitute in a 0–3 Ligue 1 defeat to Saint-Étienne on 23 February 2013. He scored his first senior goal on 26 October 2013 in the Ligue 2 game against Caen.

In June 2017, Coulibaly left Nancy to play for Willem II in the Dutch Eredivisie.

Coulibaly returned to France in January 2020, signing with Sporting Club Toulon, but only managed one appearance due to the premature end to the season. He was subsequently released and, in August 2020 signed for Championnat National side US Orléans. In November 2021, he joined SAS Épinal.

Coulibaly also played youth international football for France.

Personal life
His brothers Mohamed, Ibrahim and Aly are also footballers.

References

External links 
 
 

1993 births
Living people
French footballers
France youth international footballers
Senegalese footballers
French sportspeople of Senegalese descent
Senegalese expatriate footballers
AS Nancy Lorraine players
Willem II (football club) players
SC Toulon players
US Orléans players
SAS Épinal players
Ligue 1 players
Ligue 2 players
Championnat National players
Championnat National 2 players
Championnat National 3 players
Eredivisie players
Senegalese expatriate sportspeople in France
Expatriate footballers in France
Association football midfielders
People from Tambacounda Region